Cyril Jackson Senior Campus is an Independent Public senior secondary school in Bassendean, a suburb of Perth, Western Australia. It serves approximately 400 compulsory age and mature age students from Year 11 to Year 12.

Overview
The surrounding area saw a large growth in population in the 1950s with the creation of a public housing estate in Ashfield. The school was established in 1961 or 1962 as a standard public secondary school, but only officially opened in 1964. It was named Cyril Jackson Senior High School, after Cyril Jackson. He was the inspector-general of schools in Western Australia in the 1890s, and inaugural chairman of the West Guildford Road Board (now known as the Town of Bassendean) from 1901 to 1903. It was designed by Silver Fairbrother and Associates architects.

Cyril Jackson Senior Campus has students from Year 11 to Year 12. It is one of two schools in Western Australia that offers secondary education to adult students, although it also has school-aged students. It accepts enrolments from all over Western Australia. It offers ATAR, General, Foundation, and Certificate level courses.

Cyril Jackson Senior Campus has a university-style environment, unique among Western Australian schools, with no uniform, no bell times, and teachers referred to by their first names. Among the types of students enrolled at Cyril Jackson are formerly homeschooled people who need a location to complete ATAR courses and VET certificates, or students who do not fit in at regular schools.

In 2011 and 2012, Governor Stirling Senior High School Year 11 and 12 students were co-located at Cyril Jackson Senior Campus whilst that school was being redeveloped.

Student numbers

Notable alumni
 Ian Britza, former Liberal Party politician for the electoral district of Morley

See also

 List of schools in the Perth metropolitan area

References

Bassendean, Western Australia
Public high schools in Perth, Western Australia
Educational institutions established in 1962
1962 establishments in Australia